Nikola Gazdić-Janjčić (died 22 May 1921) was a footballer who played for Hajduk Split. Gazdić was the first Hajduk player to score more than 100 goals. He died of late stage tuberculosis after playing against Građanski Zagreb, Hajduk's greatest rival at the time, in a 2-1 victory (he scored a goal for 1-1 and was awarded a penalty that Mantler realised for 2-1 victory). He scored 106 goals in 91 matches.

Leo Lemešić named Gazdić one of the four greatest footballers in Hajduk's history.

References

Year of birth missing
1921 deaths
20th-century deaths from tuberculosis
Association football players who died while playing
Association footballers not categorized by position
HNK Hajduk Split players
Sport deaths in Croatia
Sport deaths in Yugoslavia
Footballers from Split, Croatia
Tuberculosis deaths in Croatia
Yugoslav footballers